A hoodoo (also called a tent rock, fairy chimney, or earth pyramid) is a tall, thin spire of rock formed by erosion. Hoodoos typically consist of relatively soft rock topped by harder, less easily eroded stone that protects each column from the elements. They generally form within sedimentary rock and volcanic rock formations.

Hoodoos range in size from the height of an average human to heights exceeding a 10-story building. Hoodoo shapes are affected by the erosional patterns of alternating hard and softer rock layers. Minerals deposited within different rock types can cause hoodoos to have different colors throughout their height.

Etymology

In certain regions of western North America these rocky structures are called hoodoos. The name is derived from Hoodoo spirituality, in which certain natural forms are said to possess certain powers, but by the late 19th century, this spirituality became associated with bad luck. Prior to the English name for these geographic formations they were already the origin of many legends from Native Americans. For example, hoodoos in Bryce Canyon National Park were considered petrified remains of ancient beings who had been sanctioned for misbehavior.

Occurrence
Hoodoos are found mainly in the desert in dry, hot areas. In common usage, the difference between hoodoos and pinnacles (or spires) is that hoodoos have a variable thickness often described as having a "totem pole-shaped body". A spire, however, has a smoother profile or uniform thickness that tapers from the ground upward.

Hoodoo formations are commonly found on the Colorado Plateau and in the Badland regions of the northern Great Plains (both in North America). While hoodoos are scattered throughout these areas, nowhere in the world are they so abundant as in the northern section of Bryce Canyon National Park, located in the U.S. state of Utah. Hoodoos are also very prominent a few hundred miles away at Goblin Valley State Park on the eastern side of the San Rafael Swell and in the Chiricahua National Monument of Southeast Arizona. Some hoodoos are found in Sombrerete, Mexico at the Sierra de Organos National Park.

Hoodoos (peribacası) are also found in the Cappadocia region of Turkey, where houses have been carved into the formations. These hoodoos were depicted on the reverse of the Turkish 50 new lira banknote of 2005–2009.

In Armenia, Hoodoos are found in Goris, Khndzoresk, Hin Khot and several other places in the marz of Syunik, where many were once carved into and inhabited or used.

In French, the formations are called demoiselles coiffées (ladies with hairdos) or cheminées de fées (fairy chimneys) and several are found in the Alpes-de-Haute-Provence; one of the best-known examples is the formation called Demoiselles Coiffées de Pontis.

The hoodoo stones on the northern coast of Taiwan are unusual for their coastal setting. The stones formed as the seabed rose rapidly out of the ocean during the Miocene epoch. Efforts have been made to slow the erosion in the case of iconic specimens in Wanli.

The Awa Sand Pillars in Tokushima Prefecture, Japan, are hoodoos made from layers of compacted gravel and sandstone.

Đavolja Varoš (Devil's Town) hoodoos in Serbia feature about 200 formations described as earth pyramids or towers by local inhabitants. Since 1959, Đavolja Varoš has been protected by the state. The site was also a nominee in the New Seven Wonders of Nature campaign.

The hoodoos in Drumheller, Alberta, are composed of clay and sand deposited between 70 and 75 million years ago during the Cretaceous Period. These hoodoos can maintain a unique mushroom-like appearance as the underlying base erodes at a faster rate compared to the capstones at a rate of nearly one centimeter per year, faster than most geologic structures.

Formation

Hoodoos typically form in areas where a thick layer of a relatively soft rock, such as mudstone, poorly cemented sandstone, or tuff (consolidated volcanic ash), is covered by a thin layer of hard rock, such as well-cemented sandstone, limestone, or basalt. In glaciated mountainous valleys the soft eroded material may be glacial till with the protective capstones being large boulders in the till. Over time, cracks in the resistant layer allow the much softer rock beneath to be eroded and washed away. Hoodoos form where a small cap of the resistant layer remains, and protects a cone of the underlying softer layer from erosion. The heavy cap pressing downward gives the pedestal of the hoodoo its strength to resist erosion. With time, erosion of the soft layer causes the cap to be undercut, eventually falling off, and the remaining cone is then quickly eroded.

Typically, hoodoos form from multiple weathering processes that continuously work together in eroding the edges of a rock formation known as a fin. For example, the primary weathering force at Bryce Canyon is frost wedging. The hoodoos at Bryce Canyon experience more than 200 freeze-thaw cycles each year. In the winter, melting snow, in the form of water, seeps into the cracks and then freezes at night. When water freezes, it expands by almost 10%, prying open the cracks bit by bit, making them even wider, similar to the way a pothole forms in a paved road.

In addition to frost wedging, rain is another weathering process causing erosion. In most places today, rainwater is slightly acidic, which lets the weak carbonic acid slowly dissolve limestone grain by grain. It is this process that rounds the edges of hoodoos and gives them their lumpy and bulging profiles. Where internal mudstone and siltstone layers interrupt the limestone, one may expect the rock to be more resistant to the chemical weathering because of the comparative lack of limestone. Many of the more durable hoodoos are capped with a special kind of magnesium-rich limestone called dolomite. Dolomite, being fortified by the mineral magnesium, dissolves at a much slower rate, and consequently protects the weaker limestone underneath it. Rain is also the chief source of erosion (removing the debris). In the summer, monsoon-type rainstorms travel through the Bryce Canyon region bringing short-duration high-intensity rain.

See also

References

Further reading
 DeCourten, Frank. 1994. Shadows of Time, the Geology of Bryce Canyon National Park. Bryce Canyon Natural History Association.
 Kiver, Eugene P., Harris, David V. 1999. Geology of U.S. Parklands 5th ed. John Wiley & Sons, Inc. 522–528.
 Sprinkel, Douglas A., Chidsey, Thomas C. Jr., Anderson, Paul B. 2000. Geology of Utah's Parks and Monuments. Publishers Press: 37–59

External links

 National Park Service: Bryce Canyon National Park: Nature and Geology – Hoodoos (adapted public domain text)
 Hoodoos (Erdpyramiden – demoiselles coiffées) world-wide

Rock formations
Erosion landforms
Bryce Canyon
Cappadocia